The 2003 Women's British Open Squash Championships was held at the Albert Hall in Nottingham from 29 September – 5 October 2003. The event was won by Rachael Grinham who defeated Cassie Jackman (Campion) in the final.

Seeds

Draw and results

First qualifying round

Second qualifying round

First round

Quarter finals

Semi finals

Final

References

Women's British Open Squash Championships
Squash in England
Sport in Nottingham
Women's British Open Squash Championship
2000s in Nottingham
Women's British Open Squash Championship
2003 in women's squash